NISA Nation is a semi-professional men's soccer league in the United States. The league is below the professional leagues in the United States soccer league system and began play in 2021. NISA Nation is affiliated with the third tier professional league National Independent Soccer Association.

Expansion 
The league is composed by clubs from New Jersey, Maryland, California, Delaware, New York, Nevada, Arizona, Massachusetts, Florida and Pennsylvania.

On August 25, 2021, Atlantic City FC was announced as the first club of the newly formed league. In the second half of 2021, another five clubs were announced to form the Northeast Region and to kick off for the Fall 2021 season.

In the mid 2021 Southwest Region was formed by the first 4 clubs and kicked off into 2021 Fall Season and in late 2021 the Florida Region and the Pacific Region were founded as well to begin to play in 2022 spring.

On January 6, 2022, it was announced that NISA Nation earned from the United States Adult Soccer Association the USASA provisional national league license, a license the give recognition to the league and that opens the way to U.S. Open Cup spots directly from the league.

The 2022 Southwest region was announced on March 3, and features 6 teams for the Spring season.  The season will be played March 13 to July 2 for a total of 30 matches.

Nisa Nation expanded with a third region into Florida, which was announced on March 22, 2022. It will be played from March 26 to June 25. Featuring 5 teams for a total of 30 matches.

The Northeast region was announced on March 24. The region had a net gain of two to make it eight teams to play 10 matches each. The season will be played April 2 to July 9 for a total of 40 matches.

Pacific Region season announcement planned for early April.

Associations 
NISA Nation is affiliated and plans to begin a pro-rel system with 7 division 5 leagues all over the country: the Eastern Premier Soccer League in the north east, the Gulf Coast Premier League in the deep south, the Pioneer Premier League in Tennessee and Kentucky, the Midwest Premier League in the states of Illinois, Michigan, Iowa, Wisconsin and Missouri; the Mountain Premier League in the Rocky Mountains region, the Cascadia Premier League in the Cascadia region and the Southwest Premier League in the southwestern United States.

Current Teams

Florida Region

Northeast Region

Pacific Region

Southwest Region

Former teams

Location map

Champions

Florida Region

Northeast Region

Pacific Region

Southwest Region

References

External links 
 NISA Nation website

Nation
Soccer leagues in the United States
2020 establishments in the United States
Sports leagues established in 2020